The 1998 LPGA Championship was the 44th LPGA Championship, played May 14–17 at DuPont Country Club in Wilmington, Delaware. This was the second of four major championships on the LPGA Tour in 1998.

Twenty-year-old rookie Se Ri Pak led wire-to-wire to win the first of her five majors, three strokes ahead of runners-up Donna Andrews and Lisa Hackney. Less than two months later, Pak won the next major, the U.S. Women's Open.

The DuPont Country Club hosted this championship for eleven consecutive seasons, from 1994 through 2004.

Past champions in the field

Made the cut

Source:

Missed the cut

Source:

Final leaderboard
Sunday, May 17, 1998

Source:

References

External links
Golf Observer leaderboard

Women's PGA Championship
Golf in Delaware
LPGA Championship
LPGA Championship
LPGA Championship
LPGA Championship